The Georgia national under-18 rugby union team is the under-18 team of the Georgia national rugby union team in the sport of rugby union.

History
Under-18 became a recognised age-grade in European rugby in 2004.

Wins against Tier 1 nations

European Championship
The Georgian team has been a regular competitor at the European Under-18 Rugby Union Championship, playing in the A division with moderate success for the most part. The team's greatest achievement came in 2010 when it finished third, behind France and Ireland, beating Belgium in the third-place game. In 2011, a revamped competition saw the creation of an Elite division, with Georgia once more coming third, now in the tier-two First division, behind Scotland and Italy.

European championship

Elite Division 2012

Elite Division 2013

Elite Division 2014

Elite Division 2015

Positions
The team's final positions in the European championship:

References

External links
 Official Georgia Rugby Union website

Under18
European national under-18 rugby union teams